Asaf Sagiv(born 29 July 1982) is a Los Angeles based Israeli composer who writes music for film, television, contemporary dance and theater. His work combines orchestral writing with contemporary electronic elements.

Some of his works in film include Last Summer, Drugs and the Emmy Award nominated Netflix Original ReMastered: Who Shot the Sheriff? directed by Academy Award-nominated director Kief Davidson.

He spent his early life growing up in Israel, playing guitar and keys and studying composition, and later relocated to the US.

His work for the short film Dreamwisher won the Southern Shorts Award Of Excellence for Individual Achievement In Music.

Early life and career 
Asaf was born on 29 July 1982 in Tel HaShomer, Israel to Ovadia Sagiv, an aerospace engineer and inventor, and Osnat (Sabina) Perelman, daughter of The Holocaust Survivors Sigmund and Barbara Perelman who fled Poland of World War II.

He grew up with his parents and three sisters in a quiet moshav called Ganot. He learned the guitar from the age of 12 and taught himself how to play the piano. Asaf began writing music at a young age and wrote his first orchestral piece when he was 15.  
At some point he took a break from music and taught himself how to paint by looking at the Old Masters works.

Asaf started his musical career in the early 2000s as the musical director and commander of the Israeli Air Force Band as part of his mandatory service. During this time he began to work as a guitarist and producer in various bands. It was around that period that Asaf experimented with different musical styles, coming up with his own sound.

In 2004 Asaf moved to Boston. There he collaborated with contemporary dance company Harvard-Radcliffe Modern Dance Company, as well as with playwright Rebecca Bella Wangh for the Boston Playwrights' Theatre. He attended Berklee College, where he studied film scoring and orchestration. He was invited by The Society of Composers & Lyricist to go to Los Angeles soon after, and intern their Mentor Program in Fall 2007. That same week Asaf moved to California where he started writing more for film and media.

Around 2010 he returned to Ganot to form the Indie Rock band Water Knot and led their EP tour of Europe and the US, culminating at Bonnaroo Festival. Following that he settled in London, UK for a couple of years. 
London saw Asaf return to scoring, with his second time collaborating with Italian director Leonardo Guerra Seragnoli on the feature drama Last Summer starring Rinko Kikuchi. The film premiered at Rome International Film Festival and won the AITS Award. 

Asaf's music was featured in Lionsgate's Misconduct, starring Anthony Hopkins and Al Pacino and was released in 2016 on the Soundtrack album under Varèse Sarabande.  
 
In 2018, Asaf was approached by Foxhound to write the music for their feature documentary Drugs, which he had started working on while still in London, and later completed the score in Los Angeles on the first weeks of arrival. Later on that year he contributed music for the feature drama Like Me Back. The soundtrack featured songs from the artist Beck.
Shortly after, Asaf was asked to write the score for the Netflix Original Who Shot The Sheriff. The show was nominated an Emmy Award for Outstanding Arts & Culture Documentary in 2019.

In 2020, Asaf co-composed with Haim Mazar the score for the feature film Continue. 
He also contributed music for the Netflix hit show Outer Banks and for NBC's Council of Dads produced by Jerry Bruckheimer.

Filmography

Film

Television

Theater
 Zarema: Terroristka by Rebecca Bella Wangh (Boston Playwrights' Theater)
 Romeo & Juliet with Skazi (2010, Israel Geshger Theatre)
 Akimbo Sonata by Rebecca Bella Wangh

Contemporary Dance

 The Center with Sonia K.Todorova (2005)

Personal life
Asaf left Ganot in the early 2000s, living in London before settling in Los Angeles, California. He is the youngest of four, with three older sisters, Maya, Michal and Idit.

Awards
In 2007, Asaf received The Doug Timm Award for Outstanding Musicianship
In 2019, his work for the short film Dreamwisher (2019) won the Southern Shorts Award Of Excellence for Individual Achievement In Music

References

External links 

 Official Website
 

1982 births
Minimalist composers
Musicians from Los Angeles
Living people